Stahleckeria is an extinct genus of Middle Triassic (Ladinian) dicynodonts. It lived about 240 million years ago in what is now Brazil and Namibia. As a member of the group Kannemeyeriiformes, it was similar to the genus Kannemeyeria. The genus is known from the type species Stahleckeria potens, which was first collected from the Ladinian-age Santa Maria Formation in the Paleorrota fossil site of Brazil. Stahleckeria was named in honor of Rudolf Stahlecker, who discovered the first specimens during a 1935 expedition led by paleontologist Friedrich von Huene to the Chiniquá fossil site.

Description 

Skull of Stahleckeria measured  in length. It was a contemporary of the more common Dinodontosaurus. The differences between Stahleckeria and Dinodontosaurus may reflect adaptations to feeding on different plant species.

In 2012, fossils of Stahleckeria potens were described from the Omingonde Formation in Namibia, which like the Santa Maria Formation is Ladinian in age. The Omingonde Formation is part of the Karoo Supergroup, which preserves many Triassic tetrapod fossils in southern Africa but notably lacks fossils in a hiatus called the "Ladinian gap". In addition to the remains of Stahleckeria potens, fossils of the cynodont Chiniquodon and an unidentified rauisuchian have also been found in the Omingonde deposits. The presence of these animals in South America and in Africa at the same time is strong evidence that the two continents were once one uninterrupted landmass with a uniform climate and habitat that land animals such as Stahleckeria could travel freely between.

The fossils of Stahleckeria potens discovered in Brazil are currently in Germany in the museum of the University of Tübingen.

References

Bibliography 
 Huene, F. von. 1936. "Die Fossilien Reptilien des südamerikanischen Gondwanalandes an der Zeitenwende (Denwa-Molteno-Unterkeuper = Ober-Karnisch)". Ergebnisse der Sauriergrabungen in Südbrasilien 1928/29. Lieferung 2:93-159.
 Huene, F. von. 1942. Die Fossilen Reptilien des Südamerikanischen gondwanalandes. C.H. Beck Verlag, Munich.

External links 
 Brazilian Society of Paleontology

Dicynodonts
Anomodont genera
Ladinian genera
Middle Triassic synapsids of South America
Triassic Brazil
Fossils of Brazil
Santa Maria Formation
Middle Triassic synapsids of Africa
Fossils of Namibia
Omingonde Formation
Fossil taxa described in 1935
Taxa named by Friedrich von Huene